Landvetter IS is a Swedish football club located in Landvetter.

Background
Landvetter IS currently plays in Division 2 Göteborg B which is the sixth fifth of Swedish football. They play their home matches at the Landevi IP in Landvetter.

The club is affiliated to Göteborgs Fotbollförbund. Landvetter IS have competed in the Svenska Cupen on 13 occasions and have played 26 matches in the competition. They played in the 2007 Svenska Cupen and lost 0–4 at home to Stenungsunds IF in the first round.

Season to season

Footnotes

External links
 Landvetter IS – Official website
 Landvetter IS on Facebook

Football clubs in Västra Götaland County
Association football clubs established in 1931
1931 establishments in Sweden